Delhi railway division is one of the five railway divisions under Northern Railway zone (NR) of Indian Railways. This railway division was formalised in 1952 and its headquarter is located at New Delhi in the UT of Delhi. The division is headed by Divisional Railway Manager (DRM), based at DRM Office, State entry Road, near New Delhi railway station (Pahar Ganj side).

Northern Railway Zone

In addition to the Delhi railway division, Ambala railway division, Firozpur railway division, Lucknow NR railway division and Moradabad railway division are the other 4 railway divisions under Northern Railway (NR) Zone headquartered at New Delhi.

Routes and stations network 

The Division handles 496 Passenger carrying trains and 210 Freight trains every day.

List of railway stations and towns 

This Division serves a number of historical places like Delhi, Panipat, Karnal, Kurukshetra, Meerut, Palwal, Faridabad and industrial cities like Badli, Narela, Sonipat, Panipat, Karnal, Guldhar, Modi Nagar, Partapur, Faridabad, Ballabhgarh, Palwal, Delhi Cantt, Gurgaon etc. Meerut cantt & Delhi cantt are important Military bases of Indian Army. The list includes the stations under the Delhi railway division and their station category.

See also 

 Future of rail transport in India
 Rail transport in India

References

 
Divisions of Indian Railways
1952 establishments in Uttar Pradesh